André Luiz Leite Galvão (born September 29, 1982) is a Brazilian grappler and professional mixed martial artist. A 4th degree Brazilian jiu-jitsu black belt under  Fernando "Tererê" Augusto as well as a Judo black belt, Galvão is one of the most decorated athletes ever, having won most major international tournaments multiple times.

Galvão is the co-founder and head coach of Atos Jiu Jitsu in San Diego, California, one of the most successful BJJ teams in competitive sport, and a coach to numerous world champions. He is the author of the martial arts book Drill to Win: One Year to Better Brazilian Jiu-Jitsu.

In June 2022 Galvão was inducted into the IBJJF Hall of Fame & in September 2022, he was inducted into the ADCC Hall of Fame.

Submission grappling 
Galvão has won the 2011 ADCC Submission Wrestling World Championship (weight and absolute) Brazilian National Championship, World Jiu-Jitsu Championship and Pan American Championships multiple times  and has also taken third place in the 2007 ADCC Submission Wrestling World Championship at both -77 kg and openweight. Despite his frequent competition success, Galvao has stated that he only began to learn Wrestling as an adult after he moved to America in 2008.

Galvão was a competitor in the 2009 ADCC Submission Wrestling World Championship in Barcelona, Spain where he placed second in the -88 kg class. More recently, Galvao had a standout performance in 2011, first by winning the Ultimate Absolute NYC by defeating standouts Antonio Braga Neto, Vinny Magalhaes, and Rustam Cshiev. At the 2011 ADCC Submission Wrestling World Championship Galvão captured gold in both the -88 kg and absolute weight classes defeating Rousimar Palhares and Pablo Popovitch, in each respective finals.

Galvão defeated Braulio Estima by rear naked choke in their Superfight at the 2013 ADCC Submission Wrestling World Championship.

Galvão faced Chael Sonnen at Metamoris IV on August 9, 2014.  He won the bout via a rear-naked choke submission.

On August 30, 2015, he defeated Roberto Abreu via points (6-0) at the 2015 ADCC Superfight.

At ADCC 2017, Galvão defeated Claudio Calasans via decision.

At ADCC 2019, Galvão defeated Felipe Pena via points (2-0).

Despite initially going back and forth on whether or not to retire from the sport altogether, Galvao confirmed in 2021 that he will be returning at least one more time to defend his ADCC superfight championships at the 2022 World Championship event. In November 2021, Galvao became part of the inaugural class of the ADCC Hall of Fame thanks to his records as the longest-serving superfight champion and most decorated competitor.

At ADCC 2022, Galvão lost his superfight title to Gordon Ryan, being submitted by a rear-naked choke.

Mixed martial arts 
Galvão made his mixed martial arts debut in 2008, and in 2009 he entered DREAM's 2009 Welterweight Tournament.

Since completing the tournament, Galvão fought in Strikeforce. He earned a record of 2 wins and 1 loss in the promotion before retiring from the sport.

Despite being retired from MMA for over a decade, Galvão revealed on November 30, 2020 that he was planning on making a return to professional MMA competition at some point in 2021.

On November 8, 2021, it was announced that Galvão had signed a multi-fight contract with ONE Championship. He made his promotional debut in a grappling match against ONE Middleweight and ONE Light Heavyweight Champion Reinier de Ridder at ONE: X on March 26, 2022. They grappled to a draw after 12 minutes after neither could find the submission.

Mixed martial arts record 

|-
| Loss
| align=center| 5–2
| Tyron Woodley
| TKO (punches)
| Strikeforce: Diaz vs. Noons II
| 
| align=center| 1
| align=center| 1:48
| San Jose, California, United States
|
|-
| Win
| align=center| 5–1
| Jorge Patino
| TKO (punches)
| Strikeforce: Houston
| 
| align=center| 3
| align=center| 2:45
| Houston, Texas, United States
|
|-
| Win
| align=center| 4–1
| Luke Stewart
| Decision (split)
| Strikeforce Challengers: Johnson vs. Mahe
| 
| align=center| 3
| align=center| 5:00
| Fresno, California, United States
|
|-
| Loss
| align=center| 3–1
| Jason High
| Decision (split)
| Dream 10
| 
| align=center| 2
| align=center| 5:00
| Saitama, Saitama, Japan
| DREAM Welterweight Grand Prix Semi-Final Round
|-
|  Win
| align=center| 3–0
| John Alessio
| Submission (armbar)
| Dream 8
| 
| align=center| 1
| align=center| 7:34
| Saitama, Saitama, Japan
| DREAM Welterweight Grand Prix Opening Round
|-
|  Win
| align=center| 2–0
| Mikey Gomez
| Submission (armbar)
| FSC: Evolution
| 
| align=center| 1
| align=center| 3:59
| Ontario, Canada
|
|-
|  Win
| align=center| 1–0
| Jeremiah Metcalf
| Submission (armbar)
| JG and TKT Promotions – Fighting 4 Kidz
| 
| align=center| 2
| align=center| 2:05
| Santa Monica, California, United States
|

Submission grappling record 
{| class="wikitable sortable" style="font-size:80%; text-align:left;"
!  Result
!  Opponent
!  Method
!  Event
!  Division
!  Date
!  Location
|-
|Loss|| Gordon Ryan  || Submission (rear naked choke) || ADCC 2022||Superfight|| September 18, 2022 || Las Vegas, NV
|-
|Draw|| Reinier de Ridder  || Draw || ONE: X||Superfight|| March 26, 2022 || Kallang
|-
|Win|| Felipe Pena  || Points (2-0) || ADCC 2019||Superfight|| September 29, 2019 || Los Angeles, CA
|-
|Win|| Claudio Calasans  || Points (6-0) || ADCC 2017||Superfight|| September 23, 2017 || Espoo
|-
|Loss|| Leandro Lo  || Referee Decision ||rowspan=2| IBJJF Pro League||rowspan=2|Absolute||rowspan=2| August 26, 2017 ||rowspan=2| Las Vegas, NV
|-
|Win|| Alexandre Ribeiro  || Referee Decision
|-
|Win|| Patirick Gaudio  || Referee Decision ||rowspan=4| IBJJF World Championships||rowspan=4|-88 kg||rowspan=4| June 4, 2017 ||rowspan=4| Long Beach, CA
|-
|Win|| Felipe Pena  || Points (2-0)
|-
|Win|| Kit Dale  || Points (9-0)
|-
|Win|| Jorge Britto  || Submission (kimura)
|-
|Win|| Eduardo Telles || Points (8-0) || IBJJF Sand Diego Open||Superfight|| May 13, 2017 || San Diego, CA
|-
|Win|| Jackson Souza  || Referee Decision ||rowspan=4| IBJJF World Championships||rowspan=4|-94 kg||rowspan=4| June 5, 2016 ||rowspan=4| Long Beach, CA
|-
|Win|| Cassio Francis  ||Advantages
|-
|Win|| Lucas Rocha ||Penalty
|-
|Win|| Felipe Mota  ||Submission (choke)
|-
|Win|| Bruno Bastos || Submission (rear naked choke) || Fight2Win Pro||Superfight|| May 8, 2015 || San Diego, CA
|-
|Loss|| Felipe Pena || Points (0-4) || rowspan=6|World Pro||rowspan=3|-94 kg||rowspan=3| April 22, 2016 ||rowspan=6| Abu Dhabi
|-
|Win|| Jackson Souza || Submission (wristlock)
|-
|Win|| Tiago Pessoa || Points (2-0)
|-
|Loss|| Erbeth Santos || Advantages ||rowspan=3|Absolute||rowspan=3| April 21, 2016
|-
|Win|| Davi Ramos || Advantages
|-
|Win|| Patrick Gaudio || Advantages
|-
|Win|| Romulo Barral  || Points (1-0) || Berkut 2||Superfight|| November 21, 2015 || Moscow
|-
|Win|| Igor Silva  || Technical Submission (injury) ||rowspan=9| IBJJF European Championship||Absolute|| rowspan=5|January 25, 2015 ||rowspan=9| Lisbon
|-
|Win|| Renato Cardoso ||Points (4-0) ||rowspan=4|-88 kg
|-
|Win|| Rodrigo Fajardo ||Submission (choke)
|-
|Win|| Martin Aedma ||Submission (choke)
|-
|Win|| Samuel Monin ||Submission (armbar)
|-
|Win|| Tarcisio Jardim ||Submission (armbar)||rowspan=4|Absolute||rowspan=4|January 24, 2015
|-
|Win|| Erbeth Santos ||Submission (north/south choke)
|-
|Win|| Thomas Johannesson ||Submission (armbar)
|-
|Win|| Gabriel Rosberg ||Submission (choke)
|-
|Win|| Roberto Abreu  || Points (6-0) || ADCC 2015||Superfight|| August 29, 2015 || São Paulo
|-
|Win|| Chael Sonnen  || Submission (rear-naked choke) || Metamoris IV||Superfight|| August 9, 2014 || Los Angeles, CA
|-
|Win|| Braulio Estima  || Submission (rear naked choke) || ADCC 2013||Superfight|| October 19, 2013 || Beijing
|-
|Draw|| Ryron Gracie  || Draw || Metamoris I||Superfight|| October 14, 2012 || Los Angeles, CA
|-
|Win|| Pablo Popovitch  || Submission (toe hold) ||rowspan=8| ADCC 2011||rowspan=4|Absolute||rowspan=6| September 25, 2011 ||rowspan=8| Nottingham
|-
|Win|| Murilo Santana || Points (0-0)
|-
|Win|| Sergio Moraes || Points (6-0)
|-
|Win|| Shinsho Anzai ||Submission (rear naked choke)
|-
|Win|| Rousimar Palhares || Points (9-4)||rowspan=4|-88 kg
|-
|Win|| Pablo Popovitch || Points (2-0)
|-
|Win|| Gunnar Nelson || Points (2-0)||rowspan=2|September 24, 2011
|-
|Win|| Don Ortega || Points
|-
|Win|| Rustam Chsiev  || Judges Decision ||rowspan=4| Ultimate Absolute NYC||rowspan=4|Absolute||rowspan=4| July 30, 2011 ||rowspan=4| New York City, NY
|-
|Win|| Vinny Magalhães  || Points (4-0)
|-
|Win|| Antônio Braga Neto  || Points (2-0)
|-
|Win|| Nolan Dutcher  || Submission (armbar)
|-
|Loss|| Alexandre Ribeiro  || Points (0-3) ||rowspan=6| ADCC 2009||rowspan=2|Absolute||rowspan=4| September 27, 2009 ||rowspan=6| Barcelona
|-
|Win|| Tom DeBlass  || Points (3-0)
|-
|Loss|| Braulio Estima  || Submission (inverted triangle choke) ||rowspan=4|-88 kg
|-
|Win|| David Avellan  || Points (2-0)
|-
|Win|| Kassim Annan  || Points (11-0) ||rowspan=2|September 26, 2009
|-
|Win|| Chris Weidman  || Points (4-0)
|-
|Win|| Bruno Bastos  || Submission (rear naked choke) ||rowspan=2| ADCC Brazilian Championship 2009||rowspan=2|-88 kg||rowspan=2| February 21, 2009 ||rowspan=2| São Paulo
|-
|Win|| Rodolfo Vieira  || Points
|-
|Win|| Alexandre Ferreira  || Submission (rear naked choke) ||rowspan=8| ADCC 2007||rowspan=4|Absolute||rowspan=4| May 6, 2007 ||rowspan=8| Trenton, NJ
|-
|Loss|| Robert Drysdale  || Submission (rear naked choke)
|-
|Win|| Fabricio Werdum  || Points
|-
|Win|| Baret Yoshida  || Points
|-
|Win|| Mike Fowler  || Points||rowspan=4|-77 kg||rowspan=2|May 5, 2007
|-
|Loss|| Pablo Popovitch  || Points
|-
|Win|| Mark Bocek  || Submission (heel hook)||rowspan=2|May 4, 2007
|-
|Win|| Chris Bright  || Points
|-
|Win|| Rafael dos Anjos  || Submission (heel hook) || ADCC Brazilian Championship 2007||-77 kg||February 4, 2007 || Rio de Janeiro
|-

Instructor lineage 
Mitsuyo "Count Koma" Maeda → Carlos Gracie, Sr. → Helio Gracie → Rolls Gracie → Romero "Jacare" Cavalcanti → Alexandre Paiva → Fernando "Tererê" Augusto →  André Galvao

Published works 
 Drill to Win: One Year to Better Brazilian Jiu-Jitsu (Victory Belt Publishing, 2010).
The book focuses on "learning the transitional skills of Brazilian Jiu-Jitsu and submission wrestling through proper diet, calisthenics, and technical drills".

See also 
List of Brazilian Jiu-Jitsu practitioners
List of current ONE fighters

References

External links 

Atos San Diego

Living people
1982 births
Brazilian male mixed martial artists
Welterweight mixed martial artists
Mixed martial artists utilizing Brazilian jiu-jitsu
Brazilian practitioners of Brazilian jiu-jitsu
Sportspeople from São Paulo (state)
Brazilian jiu-jitsu trainers
Martial arts school founders
People awarded a black belt in Brazilian jiu-jitsu
World Brazilian Jiu-Jitsu Championship medalists
ADCC Hall of Fame inductees
Brazilian jiu-jitsu practitioners who have competed in MMA (men)